Okomayin Segun Onimisi (born 29 November 1993) is a Nigerian footballer, who last played as a midfielder for Dubočica.

Club career
Born in Enugu, Onimisi started his senior career with local club Enugu Rangers, where he played between 2011 and 2014. In summer 2014, he moved to Serbian side Sloga Kraljevo, where he made his First League debut in 7 fixture match of the 2014–15 season, against Moravac Mrštane. At the beginning of 2015, Onimisi spent some period on trial with Donji Srem, but later moved to Montenegro and spent the whole 2015 playing with Zeta. He also spent spring half of the 2015–16 Serbian First League season with BSK Borča, before he joined Dinamo Vranje in summer 2016. Segun scored first goal since he moved to Europe in 19 fixture match of the 2016–17 Serbian First League between Dinamo Vranje and OFK Odžaci, played on 24 March 2017.

Career statistics

Club

References

External links
 

1993 births
Living people
Footballers from Enugu
Association football midfielders
Nigerian footballers
Nigerian expatriate footballers
Nigerian expatriate sportspeople in Serbia
Expatriate footballers in Serbia
Expatriate footballers in Montenegro
Rangers International F.C. players
FK Sloga Kraljevo players
FK Zeta players
FK BSK Borča players
FK Dinamo Vranje players
Serbian First League players
Serbian SuperLiga players
Montenegrin First League players